Margaret Erskine was a mistress of James V of Scotland.

Margaret Erskine may also refer to:

Margaret Erskine (athlete), British long jumper
Margaret Wetherby Williams, mystery writer who wrote as Margaret Erskine